Anthony Benedict Modeste (born 30 August 1975) is a retired Grenadian football player who represented the Grenada national football team, currently manager of Camerhogne.

Club career
Educated at Grenada Boys' Secondary School, Modeste began his career at Grenadian club Queens Park Rangers SC. After seven years at the club, Modeste moved to Jamaica, signing for Hazard United in 2002. In his first season at Hazard United, Modeste won the 2002–03 National Premier League and JFF Champions Cup, scoring five league goals in the process, as Hazard United relocated from May Pen to Portmore, renaming to Portmore United in 2003. In 2005, Modeste helped Portmore complete another double. In 2007, Portmore won another JFF Champions Cup, winning the league the following season. In 2011, Modeste returned to Grenada, signing for GBSS Demerara Mutual. After five seasons at the club, Modeste returned to Queens Park Rangers for a single season, before joining Camerhogne in 2017. Modeste retired at the club in 2019.

International career
After representing Grenada at under-15, under-20 and under-23 level, Modeste made his debut for Grenada's senior team on 29 March 1996, picking up a yellow card in a 2–1 win against Guyana. In total, Modeste scored 13 times for Grenada, including a four goal haul against Dominica on 12 March 2001.

International goals
Scores and results list Grenada's goal tally first.

Managerial career
In 2007, Modeste was appointed manager of Grenada. During the 2009 CONCACAF Gold Cup, whilst captain of the nation, Modeste took up a player-coach role in the Grenada squad. Modeste later managed St. George Royal Cannons and Camerhogne.

References

1975 births
Living people
People from St. George's, Grenada
Grenadian footballers
Grenadian expatriate footballers
Expatriate footballers in Jamaica
Grenadian expatriate sportspeople in Jamaica
Grenada international footballers
Portmore United F.C. players
2009 CONCACAF Gold Cup players
2011 CONCACAF Gold Cup players
Grenadian football managers
Grenada national football team managers
Player-coaches
Association football coaches
Association football defenders
National Premier League players